Mimoopsis is a genus of beetles in the family Cerambycidae, containing the following species:

 Mimoopsis crassepuncta Breuning, 1942
 Mimoopsis fuscoapicatus (Fairmaire, 1879)
 Mimoopsis insularis (Breuning, 1939)

References

Apomecynini